The Agápē Tour was the second headlining concert tour by American singer-songwriter JoJo. It was launched in support of her second mixtape Agápē (2012). The tour visited just six cities; an expected expansion to the East Coast of the US and to Canada never materialized.

Background
In an interview with TheYoungFolks.com on January 4, 2013, JoJo expressed plans to go on a nationwide tour hitting the East Coast, Canada and other cities in the USA. She met with her agency in January to sort out a specific route for the tour. On August 28, 2013 JoJo announced the first five West Coast tour dates entitled The "Agape Tour" via her official Twitter page with special guest Leah Labelle as the opening act. Tickets went on sale the same day.

Opening act
 Leah Labelle

Set list

Encore

Source:

 During the first show in Tempe, Arizona, JoJo performed the full version of "Weak".
 During the third show in Oakland, California, JoJo only performed half of both "Andre" and "Weak".
 During the final show in Seattle, Washington, JoJo paid tribute to Nirvana with a cover of the hometown band's classic "Smells Like Teen Spirit", which they performed at the same venue in 1992.

Tour dates

References

2013 concert tours